Phillips County (standard abbreviation: PL) is a county located in the U.S. state of Kansas. As of the 2020 census, the county population was 4,981. The largest city and county seat is Phillipsburg.

History

Early history

For many millennia, the Great Plains of North America was inhabited by nomadic Native Americans.  From the 16th century to 18th century, the Kingdom of France claimed ownership of large parts of North America.  In 1762, after the French and Indian War, France secretly ceded New France to Spain, per the Treaty of Fontainebleau.

19th century
In 1802, Spain returned most of the land to France, but keeping title to about 7,500 square miles.  In 1803, most of the land for modern day Kansas was acquired by the United States from France as part of the 828,000 square mile Louisiana Purchase for 2.83 cents per acre.

In 1854, the Kansas Territory was organized, then in 1861 Kansas became the 34th U.S. state.  In 1867, Phillips County was established.

Geography

Adjacent counties
 Harlan County, Nebraska (north)
 Franklin County, Nebraska (northeast)
 Smith County (east)
 Rooks County (south)
 Graham County (southwest)
 Norton County (west)

National protected area
 Kirwin National Wildlife Refuge

Demographics

As of the census of 2000, there were 6,001 people, 2,496 households, and 1,722 families residing in the county.  The population density was 7 people per square mile (3/km2).  There were 3,088 housing units at an average density of 4 per square mile (1/km2).  The racial makeup of the county was 98.25% White, 0.25% Black or African American, 0.30% Native American, 0.45% Asian, 0.03% from other races, and 0.72% from two or more races.  0.67% of the population were Hispanic or Latino of any race.

There were 2,496 households, out of which 28.30% had children under the age of 18 living with them, 61.50% were married couples living together, 5.50% had a female householder with no husband present, and 31.00% were non-families. 28.60% of all households were made up of individuals, and 15.80% had someone living alone who was 65 years of age or older.  The average household size was 2.35 and the average family size was 2.89.

In the county, the population was spread out, with 24.50% under the age of 18, 5.70% from 18 to 24, 23.20% from 25 to 44, 24.80% from 45 to 64, and 21.80% who were 65 years of age or older.  The median age was 42 years. For every 100 females there were 94.80 males.  For every 100 females age 18 and over, there were 91.20 males.

The median income for a household in the county was $35,013, and the median income for a family was $41,638. Males had a median income of $29,609 versus $17,827 for females. The per capita income for the county was $17,121.  About 7.20% of families and 10.00% of the population were below the poverty line, including 11.60% of those under age 18 and 8.80% of those age 65 or over.

Government

Presidential elections

Phillips County is overwhelmingly Republican. No Democratic presidential candidate has won Phillips County since Franklin D. Roosevelt in 1932, and since 1940 only two Democrats have obtained thirty percent of the county's vote: Lyndon Johnson in 1964 and Jimmy Carter in 1976.

Laws
Following amendment to the Kansas Constitution in 1986, the county remained a prohibition, or "dry", county until 1996, when voters approved the sale of alcoholic liquor by the individual drink with a 30 percent food sales requirement.

Education

Unified school districts 
 Thunder Ridge USD 110
Agra and small eastern portion of county; extends into western third of Smith County
 Northern Valley USD 212
Long Island and northwestern corner of county; extends into northeastern Norton County
 Phillipsburg USD 325
city of Phillipsburg and areas near and along US 183
 Logan USD 326
southwestern corner of county along and south of K-9; extends into southeastern Norton County

Communities

Cities
 Agra
 Glade
 Kirwin
 Logan
 Long Island
 Phillipsburg
 Prairie View
 Speed

Unincorporated communities
† means a Census-Designated Place (CDP) by the United States Census Bureau.
 Gretna
 Stuttgart†
 Woodruff†

Ghost towns

 Crow
 Dickeyville
 Goode
 Jimtown
 Luctor
 Matteson
 Myrtle
 Pleasant Green
 Powell
 Wagnerville
 West Cedar

Townships
Phillips County is divided into twenty-five townships.  The city of Phillipsburg is considered governmentally independent and is excluded from the census figures for the townships.  In the following table, the population center is the largest city (or cities) included in that township's population total, if it is of a significant size.

See also
 National Register of Historic Places listings in Phillips County, Kansas

 West Cedar, Kansas

References

Notes

Further reading

 Standard Atlas of Phillips County, Kansas; Geo. A. Ogle & Co; 78 pages; 1917.
 Plat Book of Phillips County, Kansas; North West Publishing Co; 49 pages; 1900.

External links

County
 
 Phillips County - Directory of Public Officials
Maps
 Phillips County Maps: Current, Historic, KDOT
 Kansas Highway Maps: Current, Historic, KDOT
 Kansas Railroad Maps: Current, 1996, 1915, KDOT and Kansas Historical Society

 
Kansas counties
1867 establishments in Kansas
Populated places established in 1867